Passing Through Moscow is a 1970 Soviet comedy film directed by Ilya Gurin.

Plot 
The film consists of four short stories, each of which takes place in Moscow.

Cast 
 Yevgeny Karelskikh as Volodya
 Sergey Shakurov as Stepan
 Nikolay Merzlikin as Nikolay
 Khodzhan Ovezgelenov as Yashuli Aktylbek-aka
 Lidiya Konstantinova as Yulya Sinyova
 Vyacheslav Nevinnyy as Valentin
 Vera Kuznetsova as Klavdiya Yemelyanova
 Nadezhda Karpushina as Nina
 Valentina Egorenkova as Lena Yemelyanova
 Vsevolod Kuznetsov
 Oleg Anofriyev

References

External links 
 

1970 films
1970s Russian-language films
Soviet comedy films
1970 comedy films